The 2015 myAFibRisk.com 400 was a NASCAR Sprint Cup Series race held on September 20, 2015, at Chicagoland Speedway in Joliet, Illinois. Contested over 267 laps on the 1.5 mile (2.4 km) intermediate speedway, it was the 27th race of the 2015 NASCAR Sprint Cup Series season, first race of the Chase and first race of the Challenger Round. Denny Hamlin won the race, his second of the season. Carl Edwards finished second. Kurt Busch, Ryan Newman and Matt Kenseth rounded out the top–five.

Due to qualifying being rained-out, Kevin Harvick was given the first starting spot of the race. He led 10 laps before wrecking out halfway through the race and finished 42nd. Kyle Busch led a race high of 121 laps on his way to a ninth–place finish. There were 17 lead changes among 10 different drivers, as well as six caution flag periods for 28 laps.

This was Denny Hamlin's 26th career win, second of the season, first at Chicagoland Speedway and fifth at the track for Joe Gibbs Racing. The win moved Hamlin up to second in the points trailing teammate Matt Kenseth by two. Despite being the winning manufacturer, Toyota left Chicagoland trailing Chevrolet by 49–points in the manufacturer standings.

The myAFibRisk.com 400 was carried by NBC Sports on the cable/satellite NBCSN network for the American television audience. The radio broadcast for the race was carried by the Motor Racing Network and Sirius XM NASCAR Radio.

Report

Background

Chicagoland Speedway is a  tri-oval speedway in Joliet, Illinois, southwest of Chicago. The speedway opened in 2001 and currently hosts NASCAR racing including the opening event in the Chase for the Sprint Cup. Until 2011, the speedway also hosted the IndyCar Series, recording numerous close finishes including the closest finish in IndyCar history. The speedway is owned and operated by International Speedway Corporation and located adjacent to Route 66 Raceway.

Jimmie Johnson entered Chicagoland tied with Kyle Busch and Matt Kenseth for the points lead at 2,012–points. Joey Logano entered three–points back. Kevin Harvick, Dale Earnhardt Jr., Kurt Busch and Carl Edwards entered tied for fifth six–points back. Brad Keselowski, Martin Truex Jr. and Denny Hamlin entered tied for ninth nine–points back. Jamie McMurray, Jeff Gordon, Ryan Newman, Paul Menard and Clint Bowyer entered tied for 12th 12–points back.

Change to restart officiating
Following complaints of Matt Kenseth jumping the final restart at Richmond, NASCAR decided to add a camera feed and official with the sole purpose of monitoring the restart zone.

NASCAR record
When the green flag flies on Sunday, Jeff Gordon – who made his first career Sprint Cup Series start in the 1992 Hooters 500 at what was then Atlanta International Raceway (now Atlanta Motor Speedway) – tied Ricky Rudd's record for most consecutive starts at 788. The 23–year veteran of the sport will break the tie next weekend at New Hampshire Motor Speedway. “I’ve got to get through this weekend first,” he said. “That’s one of those things where I feel a little strange talking about it because I do appreciate and respect the safety of this sport. (That) side can be taken away from you at any time. I want to break that record. I think it’s a huge accomplishment because it’s not easy to do. It’s easier today because the sport is safer. I look at Ricky Rudd and what he went through to make it. That is pretty extraordinary. I can’t quite compare that.”

Entry list
The entry list for the myAFibRisk.com 400 was released on Sunday, September 13 at 11:49 a.m. Eastern time. Forty-six cars were entered for the race. All but Ryan Blaney in the No. 21 Wood Brothers Racing Ford were entered for the previous week's race at Richmond. The two driver changes for this weekend's race were Travis Kvapil returning to the No. 30 Chevrolet for The Motorsports Group and Josh Wise returning to the No. 32 Go FAS Racing Ford.

First practice

Qualifying

Three rounds of knockout qualifying took place at 6:45 p.m., but heavy rain forced the session to be cancelled and the starting lineup was set by first practice times according to the NASCAR rulebook. As a result, Kevin Harvick was awarded the first starting spot for the race. He was joined on the front row by Joey Logano. "We haven’t been in race trim yet," Logano said. "We stayed in qualifying trim all day today and I felt like it was qualifying during practice. We were really trying to top the charts. We really felt like that was where we would be starting at the end of practice. Obviously this storm is huge and we didn’t have a shot in hell of making qualifying happen.” “It is a lot better than last year when we started 25th," Brad Keselowski – who started third – said. "We will take that and move on. The car has been pretty good so far so I feel good about that." Ryan Blaney, Travis Kvapil and Michael McDowell failed to qualify for the race.

Qualifying results

Practice (post-qualifying)

Second practice

Final practice

Race

First half

Start
Under clear blue Illinois skies, Kevin Harvick led the field to the green flag at 3:18 p.m. He edged out Joey Logano to lead the first lap. The first caution of the race flew on the second lap when A. J. Allmendinger came down across the nose of Denny Hamlin and went spinning in turn 3. Trying to avoid ramming the No. 47 car, Hamlin got loose on the high-side, spun out and slid down the race track. He didn't suffer any damage and he continued on racing.

The race restarted on lap 7. Martin Truex Jr. forced Harvick up the track to take the lead the next lap. By lap 15, Austin Dillon was pressuring him for the top spot, but got loose in turn 3 and lost the second position to Harvick. By lap 23, Harvick pulled up next to Truex and edged out front but the No. 78 car beat him back to the line. By lap 36, Kyle Busch, now in second place, began to pressure Truex for the lead. Finally, Busch slid up in front of him to take the lead on lap 47. A number of cars began hitting pit road on lap 52 and Busch hit pit road from the lead on lap 54. In a rare circumstance, the lead didn't change at all through the cycle. Alex Bowman and Carl Edwards were both tagged for speeding on pit road and they had to serve drive-through penalties.

Second quarter
When the pit cycle was over, Busch began driving away from the field. 20 laps later, Harvick began to run him down. However, lapped traffic prevented him from getting close to the leader. On lap 87, Kurt Busch, running fifth at the time, made an unscheduled stop after slamming the wall in turn 3. Despite this, the race continued under green. Another round of green flag pit stops began on lap 100 and Ky. Busch surrendered the lead to make his stop on lap 106 and handed it to Dale Earnhardt Jr. He pitted the next lap to give the lead back to Busch. Debris on the backstretch brought out the second caution of the race on lap 123.

The race restarted on lap 129. Harvick edged out Busch on the backstretch and took the lead. The third caution of the race flew on lap 130 when Dillon blew his right-front tire out and slammed the wall in turn 2. He would go on to finish 43rd 69–laps down.

Second half

Halfway
The race restarted on lap 135. Harvick spun the tires on the restart and lost the lead to Kyle Busch. Joey Logano hit the rear of Jimmie Johnson's car and forced him onto the apron. Johnson then made contact with Harvick and damaged his left-rear fender. His left-rear tire blew out and sent his car backwards into the turn 3 wall, bringing out the fourth caution on lap 137. “I got a pretty good restart and obviously (Joey Logano) and (Johnson) got a run. I just held my line and (Johnson) just slammed into the side of my door,” Harvick explained. "That was pretty much it.” “He didn’t leave me any space,” Johnson explained after the race. “He was pinning me down, and I had to get back up on the track. I wouldn’t say that what he did was any different than other situations I’ve been in like that. When you are in his position, you want to get the inside car in a bad angle so they have to lift. I was fine with lifting, but I had to get back on the race track, so I worked my way back up on the track.”

The race restarted on lap 145. Busch spun the tires on the start and lost the lead to Jeff Gordon. It was the first restart that prompted a review by NASCAR and they found that it was a clean restart. He was the first to hit pit road on lap 184 and handed the lead to Kurt Busch. Kurt pitted the next lap and give the lead to brother Kyle Busch. Kyle pitted the next lap and handed the lead to Kyle Larson. Larson pitted two laps later and handed the lead to Carl Edwards. Debris in turn 4 brought out the fifth caution of the race on lap 191. Kyle Busch opted not to pit and assumed the lead.

Fourth quarter

The race restarted with 71 laps to go. After drag racing through the front stretch, Kurt Busch passed his brother for the lead with 46 laps to go. Edwards began the final cycle of pit stops with 29 laps to go. Kurt Busch pitted with 28 laps to go and handed the lead to Hamlin. Hamlin pitted with 24 laps to go and handed the lead to teammate Matt Kenseth. Kenseth hit pit road with 23 laps to go and the lead cycled back to Kurt Busch. Allmendinger was tagged for speeding on pit road and was forced to serve a drive-through penalty. Debris in turn 2 brought out the sixth caution of the race with 10 laps to go. The debris were pieces of a brake rotor that came from the No. 83 car of Matt DiBenedetto. "Did the yellow even need to come out? I don't even know," Kurt Busch said after the race. He, Gordon and Hamlin opted to stay out while the rest of the lead lap cars opted to pit.

The race restarted with five laps to go. Gordon got a good start on Kurt, but he was passed underneath by Hamlin, forced up the track and ultimately finished 14th. Denny drove on to score his 26th career victory.

Post-race

Driver comments
“This team doesn’t give up, that’s a perfect example today,” Hamlin said. “Fast race cars are what we have and that was why we were able to come back and win today from that early trouble.”

"I'll tell you what, my guys just do a great job on pit road, they really do," Edwards said. "Darian never loses his cool ever. He played the game perfectly with pit strategy. Then at the end, truly, once we got into Turn 1 on the final restart, I was like, I got this thing. I got better tires than all these guys. Kurt (Busch) was unbelievable on old tires. Then I thought, Denny is mine, he's a sitting duck. He drove the wheels off of that thing. He really hung on with those tires that he had."

“...overall, I’m really proud of this team and everybody at Haas Automation and Stewart Haas Racing,” Kurt Busch said. “This Chevy was fast. It was fast enough to win. When the caution came out there at the end, I thought we had the right strategy, but we didn’t. But this is a point’s day. This is a long journey through these next 10 weeks. We weren’t given a hall pass now, through Loudon and through Dover. We’ve just got to work hard as a team and saddle-up. This isn’t just a win and take a couple of weeks off, but we had a winning car today. It’s kind of a shame. We had a good run at Fontana earlier this year and it kind of ended up the same way.”

“We had a really good car. We were good most of the race and then that one caution came out after we pitted we went a lap down,” Ryan Newman said after a fourth-place finish. “The next restart we had a bad restart and it looked like we were done and that was it.”

“I didn’t choose the right direction to go,” Dale Earnhardt Jr. said after a 12th-place finish. “I thought we would all jump to the top and go around those guys, and we’d be good. But Jeff slid up in front of us and we all had to stop and everybody was going by us on the bottom. Those late restarts with those guys up there on used tires are just going to be bad. You just have to get lucky and we didn’t get lucky. Not anything there about skill, it is all luck. … We had a good day going and … cautions throw all that work out the window.”

"I knew we were going to have a tough time not spinning the tires," Gordon said about the final restart after a 14th-place finish in his record-tying 788th consecutive career start. "Especially when you're on the front row. So, I was just trying to hold pace with Kurt. I knew that Denny was behind me on older tires as well, so I was somewhat encouraged by that."

"I'm just really proud of everybody on our...team for not giving up and doing all the things they had to do to get the car back on the track," Harvick said after a disappointing 42nd-place finish. "...we've just got to go win one of these [next two] races."

Confrontation

Following the race, Jimmie Johnson went to Kevin Harvick's motorhome in the driver's lot to talk the incident over with the driver of the No. 4 Chevrolet. But when he got to Harvick's motorhome, he was greeted with a punch to the chest. The situation had to be diffused by Harvick's business manager Josh Jones and wife DeLana. They escorted him to a waiting white SUV and drove off from the race track.

Afterwards, Johnson said that he "assume[d] he would try to find it [as] my fault. I just simply needed the lane to get back on the racetrack. By no means was I trying to do anything different. I've seen him on the flat working his way back up looking for a racing lane. That is what I was doing. I was on the bottom trying to get back up on the racing surface, and he was trying to pin me down and I had to get back up or else it would have been a hell of a mess."

Joey Logano, who appeared to make contact with No. 48 Chevrolet, said that he never touched him or forced him down onto the apron going into turn 1. "I don't know. I was a little behind it," said Logano, who finished sixth in the Chase opener. "I just saw the 48 go three-wide bottom, and I was just trying to protect my position and figure out what lane I wanted to go in from there."

In his weekly appearance on the Sirius XM NASCAR Radio program The Morning Drive, NASCAR Executive Vice–President and Chief Racing Development Officer Steve O'Donnell told Mike Bagley and Pete Pistone that “there won’t be any penalties ” issued for the confrontation and explained the sanctioning body's reason behind the decision.

Penalties
On the Wednesday following the race, NASCAR issued penalties to the No. 10 Stewart-Haas Racing team and No. 15 Michael Waltrip Racing team.

The No. 10 team was penalized for an infraction that occurred during pre-qualifying inspection on September 18. This is a P2 level penalty (Sections 12.1 and 20.4b and 20.4.2a of the NASCAR rule book). The right side quarter panel behind the rear wheel/tire was modified during pre-qualifying inspection. Crew chief Daniel Knost was placed on NASCAR probation through December 31, 2015. Car chief Pete White was placed on NASCAR probation through December 31.
The No. 15 team was penalized for an infraction that occurred on opening day inspection September 18. This is a P4 level penalty (Section 12.1, 20. 14.c, 20.14.2.1.k, 12.5.3.4.d, 12.5.3.4.1.d & f, 12.5.3.4.2 of the NASCAR rule book). Crew chief Billy Scott was fined 75–thousand dollars, suspended for the next three NASCAR Sprint Cup Series Championship events and placed on NASCAR probation for six months following the issue of suspension. Driver Clint Bowyer has been penalized 25–points. Car owner Rob Kauffman has been penalized 25 owner points.

Michael Waltrip Racing released a statement saying that it "respectfully disagrees" with the penalties and would immediately appeal. "MWR has made mistakes in the past, but we feel we are correct in this instance," the team said. "We look forward to the opportunity to present our case to the appeals committee and have no further public comment until the process is completed."

NASCAR requested to the Appeals Administrator of the National Motorsports Appeals Panel that the appeals process described in the rule book be expedited.

On Wednesday, September 30, the National Motorsports Appeal Panel upheld the penalty levied against the team. The team decided not to make a final appeal and released a statement that said they were "disappointed with the outcome of today’s ruling and still feel our interpretation is within the guidelines. Rather than continue the appeals process, MWR is ready to focus 100 percent of our company’s resources on winning at Dover and trying to advance to the Contender Round of the Chase for the NASCAR Sprint Cup."

Race results

Race statistics
17 lead changes among 10 different drivers
6 cautions for 28 laps
Time of race: 2 hours, 51 minute, 30 seconds
Average speed: 
Denny Hamlin took home $306,315 in winnings

Race awards
 Coors Light Pole Award: No winner
 3M Lap Leader: Kyle Busch (121 laps)
 American Ethanol Green Flag Restart Award: Kyle Busch
 Duralast Brakes "Bake In The Race" Award: Kevin Harvick
 Freescale "Wide Open": Kurt Busch
 Ingersoll Rand Power Move: Ryan Newman (5 positions)
 MAHLE Clevite Engine Builder of the Race: Toyota Racing Development, #11
 Mobil 1 Driver of the Race: Kyle Busch (130.6 driver rating)
 Moog Steering and Suspension Problem Solver of The Race: Kurt Busch (crew chief Tony Gibson (0.519 seconds))
 NASCAR Sprint Cup Leader Bonus: No winner: rolls over to $240,000 at next event
 Sherwin-Williams Fastest Lap: Kyle Busch (Lap 136, 29.572)
 Sunoco Rookie of The Race: Brett Moffitt

Media

Television
NBCSN covered the race on the television side. Rick Allen, Jeff Burton and Steve Letarte had the call in the booth for the race. Dave Burns, Mike Massaro, Marty Snider and Kelli Stavast handled pit road on the television side.

Radio
MRN had the radio call for the race, which was simulcast on Sirius XM NASCAR Radio. Joe Moore, Jeff Striegle and Rusty Wallace called the race from the booth when the field was racing down the front stretch. Dave Moody called the race from a billboard outside of turn 2 when the field was racing through turns 1 and 2. Mike Bagley called the race from a billboard outside of turn 3 when the field was racing through turns 3 and 4. Alex Hayden, Winston Kelley and Steve Post worked pit road on the radio side.

Standings after the race

Drivers' Championship standings

Manufacturers' Championship standings

Note: Only the first sixteen positions are included for the driver standings.

Note

References

myAFibRisk.com 400
myAFibRisk.com 400
NASCAR races at Chicagoland Speedway